Chad Brownlee (born July 12, 1984) is a Canadian country music artist, songwriter, actor, and former ice hockey defenceman. He has one #1 Canada Country hit with "Forever's Gotta Start Somewhere".

Sports career

Brownlee was a draft pick for the Vancouver Canucks in 2003, going in the sixth round No. 190th overall. After four years of playing for the NCAA's Minnesota State Mavericks (located in Mankato, Minn.), Brownlee made his professional debut with the ECHL's Idaho Steelheads playing a lone season with the club in the 2007–08 season before ending his playing career.

Music career
Following a series of injuries, he turned his attention to music the following year. His first single, "The Best That I Can (Superhero)", was released in November 2009. Brownlee's self-titled debut album, produced by Mitch Merrett, was released in August 2010 via MDM Recordings. He followed it up with Love Me or Leave Me in 2012. Brownlee was nominated for a Juno Award for Country Album of the Year on February 19, 2013. The awards took place on April 21 in Regina, Saskatchewan. Brownlee's third album, The Fighters, was released on June 3, 2014.

Brownlee landed his first #1 hit with "Forever's Gotta Start Somewhere" in April 2019. It was included on the EP Back in the Game, which was released on June 21, 2019 via Universal Music Canada. Brownlee extended that to become his fourth album on January 10, 2020. On June 3rd, after he shared a controversial social media post from another artist in light of the George Floyd protests and Black Lives Matter movement that some viewed as "racist and anti-semitic", Brownlee was dropped from his record label. He later apologized for the incident and vowed to make donations to relevant charities and associations.

A July 2020 Nielsen Music study found Brownlee to be the eighth-highest played Canadian artist on domestic radio in the first half of 2020, ahead of Brett Kissel and JP Saxe, and behind Dallas Smith and Drake.

Acting career
Brownlee's first role as an actor came in 2010 film Tooth Fairy as a unnamed hockey player with no lines. He appeared in the 2021 film Range Roads as Bruce, the ex-boyfriend of the main character Frankie.

Discography

Albums

Extended plays

Singles

Other charted songs

Music videos

Awards and nominations

Ice hockey career statistics

References

External links

Chad Brownlee at CMT
 

1984 births
Canadian country singer-songwriters
Canadian ice hockey defencemen
Canadian male film actors
Canadian male singer-songwriters
Ice hockey people from British Columbia
Idaho Steelheads (ECHL) players
Living people
Musicians from Kelowna
Sportspeople from Kelowna
Vancouver Canucks draft picks
Vernon Vipers players
Minnesota State Mavericks men's ice hockey players
Minnesota State University, Mankato alumni
Canadian Country Music Association Rising Star Award winners
21st-century Canadian male singers
Universal Music Group artists